The Apollo is a 2019 American documentary film directed by Roger Ross Williams. The film looks at the unique history and contemporary legacy of the iconic Apollo Theater while following the Apollo's inaugural staging of Ta-Nehisi Coates' acclaimed "Between the World and Me."

The Apollo had its world premiere on April 24, 2019, at the Tribeca Film Festival. It received positive reviews and won the Primetime Emmy Award for Outstanding Documentary or Nonfiction Special in 2020 while also being shortlisted for nomination of the Academy Award for Best Documentary Feature Film at the 92nd Academy Awards.

Reception 
The review aggregator website Rotten Tomatoes surveyed 22 critics and assessed 21 as positive and 1 as negative for a 95% rating. Metacritic determined an average rating of 7.7/10.

Leah Greenblatt of Entertainment Weekly scored The Apollo an A-, writing "Oscar-winning director Roger Ross Williams stacks his story accordingly, drawing warm testimonials from some of the biggest names to ever grace its stage, including Aretha Franklin, Smokey Robinson, Gladys Knight, Jamie Foxx, and Pharrell Williams. But the [film] also works beautifully as a mosaic, unfurling its rich history without failing to acknowledge that it takes more than nostalgia to keep a cultural institution alive. In that sense, The Apollo feels like both a necessary lesson and a gift."

Accolades 
The Apollo won the Primetime Emmy Award for Outstanding Documentary or Nonfiction Special at the 72nd Primetime Emmy Awards.

The Apollo was additionally one of fifteen documentaries shortlisted for nomination of the Academy Award for Best Documentary Feature Film at the 92nd Academy Awards.

References